Hjartdøla is a river in Hjartdal municipality in Vestfold og Telemark, Norway. The river is formed at the convergence of Skjesvatnet, Breidvatnet and Bjordøla. From here, it runs into lake Hjartsjå and through Hjartdal, before it junction with Skogsåa in Sauland, and then changes its name to the Heddøla, which runs through Heddal and into Heddalsvatnet. The whole watercourse is known as Skiensvassdraget.

Rivers of Vestfold og Telemark